Nậm Pồ is a district in Điện Biên province in the Northwest region of Vietnam. As of 2012, the district had a population of 43,542. The district covers an area of 1,498.12 km². The district capital lies at Nà Hỳ commune.

Nậm Pồ district was formed from portions of Mường Chà district and Mường Nhé district on August 25th, 2012.

The district is divided into 15 rural communes, including: Chà Cang, Chà Nưa, Chà Tở, Na Cô Sa, Nà Bủng, Nà Hỳ, Nà Khoa, Nậm Chua, Nậm Khăn, Nậm Nhừ, Nậm Tin, Pa Tần, Phìn Hồ, Si Pa Phìn and Vàng Đán.

References 

Districts of Điện Biên province
Điện Biên province